The 2013 World Cup Taekwondo Team Championships was the 5th edition of the World Cup Taekwondo Team Championships, and was held in Abidjan, Ivory Coast from November 28 to November 30, 2013.

Medalists

Men

Preliminary round

Group A

Group B

Group C

Group D

Knockout round

Women

Preliminary round

Group A

Group B

Knockout round

References

External links
Official website

World Cup
Taekwondo World Cup
World Cup Taekwondo Team Championships
Taekwondo Championships